Cunningham is an unincorporated community within the Cunningham Township of  Person County in North Carolina, United States, which bears the name of a local landowner and planter, John W. Cunningham, according to Powell. Also, a post office was established there, possibly as early as 1822. It is also home to Waverly Plantation which was built circa 1830 and added to the National Register of Historic Places in 1974.

External links
Cunningham, NC Hometown Locator

GNIS Cunningham, NC

References

Unincorporated communities in Person County, North Carolina
Unincorporated communities in North Carolina